Czepielin  is a village in the administrative district of Gmina Mordy, within Siedlce County, Masovian Voivodeship, in east-central Poland.

The village has a population of 360.

References

Czepielin